"Everything" is the third single from Jody Watley's second album, Larger Than Life. "Everything" was the third consecutive top-ten Pop and R&B single from that album in the U.S., peaking at #4 and #3, respectively. The single only reached #74 in the United Kingdom.

History
"Everything" was the follow up single after "Friends", and became the third consecutive Top 10 hit from Watley's Larger Than Life album. The ballad "Everything" debuted on the U.S. Billboard Hot 100 singles chart at #92 the week of October 14, 1989, and advanced to its peak position of #4 the week of January 20, 1990, where it remained for two weeks. Overall, the single spent ten weeks in the Top 20 of the chart.

Charts

Weekly charts

Year-end charts

Cover versions
The song was partly translated into Cantonese by Richard Lam, "Everything" is the title track of Wong Ching Man's second commercial album, originally released in 1990. This was before she became better known as Faye Wong.

References

Jody Watley songs
1989 singles
1990 singles
Pop ballads
Faye Wong songs
1989 songs
Songs written by Gardner Cole
MCA Records singles
Songs written by André Cymone